Chengdu-Guiyang high-speed railway is a major trunk high-speed railway between the provincial capitals of Chengdu, Sichuan and Guiyang, Guizhou via a small section traversing north east Yunnan province. It was selected for construction under the 11th Five Year Plan set by the Chinese Government. Construction started in 2010 and was expected to be completed by 2014. The northern section of this line between Chengdu and Leshan forms the southern part of the operational Chengdu–Mianyang–Leshan intercity railway.

The  Chengdu – Leshan section opened in 2014, the  Leshan – Yibin opened in June 2019, while last  Yibin - Guiyang section opened in December 2019. Almost 82% of the route is on 468 bridges or in 183 tunnels.

Route
The  route commences at Chengdu East, the line proceed south to Leshan and Yibin with in Sichuan before crossing the border into north east Yunnan at Zhaotong, Yiliang County, Zhenxiong County. Once into Guizhou, it travels through Bijie before arriving at Guiyang East. There is a  branch from this route at Leshan to serve the large tourist demands at Emei Shan.

References

High-speed railway lines in China
Rail transport in Guizhou
Rail transport in Sichuan
Railway lines opened in 2014
Airport rail links in China

25 kV AC railway electrification